South Section  is a community on the Eastern Shore of the Halifax Regional Municipality in the Canadian province of Nova Scotia in the Musquodoboit Valley.

Navigator

References
Explore HRM
South Section Destination Nova Scotia

Communities in Halifax, Nova Scotia
General Service Areas in Nova Scotia